Urmas Hepner (born 31 July 1964) is an Estonian former footballer, who is currently coaching Levadia Tallinn's reserves, as well as working in the club's youth system. In 1992 Hepner was named Estonian Footballer of the Year.

During his career, Hepner played for numerous clubs in Estonia and Finland and won a total of 13 caps for Estonia national football team. He earned his first official cap on 3 June 1992, when Estonia played Slovenia in a friendly match.

Honours

Individual
Estonian Footballer of the Year: 1992

References

1964 births
Living people
Footballers from Tallinn
Soviet footballers
Estonian footballers
FC Norma Tallinn players
Meistriliiga players
FC Flora players
FCI Levadia Tallinn players
FC Lantana Tallinn players
Estonia international footballers
Estonian expatriate footballers
Expatriate footballers in Finland
Estonian expatriate sportspeople in Finland
Kotkan Työväen Palloilijat players
Association football defenders
Association football midfielders